Wilton Priory was a priory in Wiltshire, England.

Monasteries in Wiltshire